The Constitution of 1921 (Ottoman Turkish: Teşkilât-ı Esasiye Kanunu) was the fundamental law of Turkey for a brief period from 1921 to 1924. The first constitution of the modern Turkish state, it was ratified by the Grand National Assembly of Turkey in January 1921. It was a simple document consisting of only 23 short articles. In October 1923 the constitution was amended to declare Turkey to be a republic. In April the following year the constitution was replaced by an entirely new document, the Constitution of 1924.

Background

It was prepared by the Grand National Assembly that was elected both as a Constitutional Convention and as an acting Parliament on April 23, 1920, following the de facto collapse of the Ottoman Empire in the aftermath of the First World War. Mustafa Kemal Atatürk, who would later become the first president of the Republic of Turkey in 1923, was the major driving force behind the preparation of a Constitution that derived its sovereignty from the nation and not from the Sultan, the absolute monarch of the Ottoman Empire. The National Assembly convened with the purpose of writing a would prepare the ground for the proclamation of a Republic and consecrate the principle of national sovereignty. This Constitution would also serve as the legal basis for the Turkish War of Independence during 1919-1923, since it would refute the principles of the Treaty of Sèvres of 1918 signed by the Ottoman Empire, by which a great majority of the Empire's territory would have to be ceded to the Entente powers that had won the First World War.

Overview

The National Assembly commenced the debates for a new constitution on November 19, 1920 and it was ratified during the session of January 20, 1921. It was the first Turkish Constitution that consecrated the principle of national sovereignty.

It was a relatively short text consisting of twenty-three articles, the first nine articles laying out the principles upon which the state would be founded. It delegated the executive and legislative prerogatives to "the only true delegate of the sovereignty of the Nation", the National Assembly that was to be elected by direct popular vote. After the proclamation of the Republic on October 29, 1923, the executive powers were to be exercised by the President and the Council of Ministers on behalf of the National Assembly.

Because of the larger geopolitical conjecture of the time and the lack of a formal declaration of a republic, it failed to mention anything about the role the Sultan might play under this new constitution. From a technical point of view, it could be argued that it left open the possibility that the Sultanate might not be abolished and that it could have been amended to make way for a constitutional monarchy, similar to one founded by the French Constitution of 1791. On hindsight, however, it is clear that this omission was on purpose awaiting the outcome of the Independence War and the cessation of hostilities before the proclamation of the Republic.

It also didn't include any references to the judicial system for similar reasons, nor did it define the rights and responsibilities of citizens.

Timeline
After having come into force on January 20, 1921, it stayed as the law of the land for three years until the adoption of the Constitution of 1924. During this time it witnessed many extremely important and fundamental events in the history of the Republic of Turkey:
The Turkish War of Independence was won by the Turkish forces
The Ottoman Sultanate and all aristocratic titles were abolished on November 1, 1922
The Treaty of Lausanne that led to the international recognition of the new Republic was signed between Turkey and the Entente powers that had won the First World War on July 24, 1923
The Republic was officially proclaimed on October 29, 1923 with Atatürk as its first President
The title of the Caliphate that was held by the Ottoman Sultans since 1517 was abolished on March 3, 1924, along with all the remaining vestiges of Islamic Law. (Its powers within Turkey were transferred to the National Assembly and the title has since been inactive. Though very unlikely, the Turkish Republic still retains the right to reinstate the Caliphate.)
Per the law of March 3, 1924, the last Ottoman Sultan, the last Caliph and all members of their imperial families had their citizenships revoked, were exiled forever from the new Republic and their descendants banned from ever setting foot in its territory. The same law also nationalized all the properties of the Imperial Crown without compensation.

Text (as enacted)
The text of the first nine articles may be translated as follows:

Article 10 is headed Administration. Articles 11 to 21 concern local government units. These subdivisions are called Vilâyet (Art. 11-14), Kaza (Art. 15) and Nahiye (Art. 16-21). Articles 22 to 23 provide for the General Inspectorate (Umumi Müfettişlik). There is also a final provisional article, which is unnumbered.

References

External links
Extracts from the Constitution of 1921 (English)
Complete Text of the Turkish Constitution of 1921 and its amendments (Turkish)
Grand National Assembly of Turkey 

Constitutions of Turkey
Defunct constitutions
Constitution
1921 documents